Apertures are areas on the walls of a pollen grain, where the wall is thinner and/or softer. For germination it is necessary that the pollen tube can reach out from the inside of the pollen grain and transport the sperm to the egg deep down in the pistil. The apertures are the places where the pollen tube is able to break through the (elsewhere very tough) pollen wall.

The number and configuration of apertures are often very exactly characteristic of different groups of plants. In Gymnosperms, pollen is usually sulcate, i.e. has a single aperture placed distally compared to the placement of the pollen grains in the meiotic tetrad. The largest clade of angiosperms, the Eudicots, usually have three apertures that run from the proximal side of the pollen grain to the distal side: this apertures are named colpi, and the pollen type of the Eudicots is called tricolpate.

References

Further reading

Pollination